Akwugo Emejulu is a professor of sociology at the University of Warwick. She focuses on political sociology, including inequalities across Europe and grassroots campaigns for women of colour.

Early life and education 
Emejulu completed her bachelor's degree in political science at the American University. She joined the University of Glasgow for her graduate studies, earning a Master of Philosophy in Urban Policy. She moved to the University of Strathclyde for her PhD, which she was awarded in 2010. Her PhD thesis considered community development as a discourse, identities and social practises in the US and UK.

Career 
Emejulu worked as a community organiser in the United States and United Kingdom. She was a senior lecturer at the University of Edinburgh. She was concerned that white supremacists influenced the Brexit vote.

In 2017 Emejulu joined the University of Warwick as a professor of sociology.  She is part of an Open Society Foundation project called Women of Colour Resist. The project looks to map the processes that women of colour use for activism. She works extensively with Leah Bassel at the University of Leicester.

Books 
 2015 Community Development as Micropolitics: Comparing Theories, Policies and Politics in America and Britain
 2017 Minority Women and Austerity: Survival and Resistance in France and Britain
 2019 To Exist is to Resist: Black Feminism in Europe

References 

Year of birth missing (living people)
Living people
Alumni of the University of Glasgow
Academics of the University of Warwick
British women sociologists
British women social scientists
Political sociologists
American University alumni
American women political scientists
American political scientists
American women academics
21st-century American women